Cheshmeh Haqqi (also Romanized as Cheshmeh Ḩaqqī and Cheshmeh-ye Ḩaqqī; also known as Boneh-ye Ḩaqqī) is a village in Qaleh-ye Khvajeh Rural District, in the Central District of Andika County, Khuzestan Province, Iran. At the 2006 census, its population was 166, in 24 families.

References 

Populated places in Andika County